This is a list of past and present members of the Senate of Canada representing the province of Newfoundland and Labrador.

Current senators

Notes:

1 Senators are appointed to represent Newfoundland and Labrador. Each senator may choose to designate a geographic area within the province as his or her division.

Historical

Notes:

1 Senators are appointed to represent Newfoundland and Labrador. Each senator may choose to designate a geographic area within the province as his or her division.
2 Senators are appointed by the Governor-General of Canada on the recommendation of the prime minister.

See also
Lists of Canadian senators

External links
Current Senators List Parliament Website

 
Newfoundland and Labrador
Senators
Senators